Thomas Mbomba is a Ghanaian politician and a public servant. He is the member of parliament for the Tatale/Sanguli constituency.

Early life and education 

Mbomba was born on 29 September 1976. In 1988, Mbomba obtained his middle school certificate. He earned his Ordinary Level and Advanced Level certificates in 1994 and 1996 respectively. Following his secondary education, Mbomba pursued a bachelor of arts degree in Sociology and Political Science, which he received in 2009 from the University of Ghana. In 2012, he was awarded his Master's degree in Human Resource Management.

Career 
Prior to entering parliament, he worked as the operations manager for Ghana Post. He also worked With the Ministry of Local Government and Rural Development as a District Chief Executive.

Personal life 
Mbomba is a Christian and is married with four children. He hails from Nahuyili.

References 

Ghanaian MPs 2021–2025
University of Ghana alumni
1976 births
Living people